Timothy Richard Hornsby CBE (born 22 September 1940) is British. He is Chairman of the Horniman Museum 2004–present. He is the son of Harker William Hornsby.

References
 HORNSBY, Timothy Richard', Who's Who 2011, A & C Black, 2011; online edn, Oxford University Press, Dec 2010 ; online edn, Oct 2010 retrieved 22 May 2011
 http://www.debretts.co.uk/people/biographies/browse/h/499/Timothy%20Richard+HORNSBY.aspx 

1940 births
Living people
Place of birth missing (living people)